Thormod Ness (born 27 November 1972) is a Norwegian football coach and former player.

He started his career in Skånevik IL, and later went to SK Vard Haugesund. He joined FK Haugesund in 1996, and enjoyed a spell in the Norwegian Premier League in the seasons 1997 and 1998. The team was relegated that year, but returned in 2000. Ness was the team captain at that time.

He left Haugesund ahead of the 2002 season for Sogndal Fotball. However, he broke his leg in May 2002, and when he returned to football two and a half years later, his club was Vard Haugesund. He retired ahead of the 2006 season, this time due to a back injury.

Having been offered non-playing positions in different clubs already in 2005, Ness worked as an assistant coach for Vard in 2006. Ahead of the 2007 season Vard was looking for a new head coach. Ness applied for the job, but as Vard hired Steinar Lein, Ness was only offered to continue as assistant coach, which he rejected. He also rejected another offer to do a comeback as a player. Ahead of the 2008 season, Ness became the head coach of Torvastad IL on the fifth tier of Norwegian football.

References

1972 births
Living people
Norwegian footballers
SK Vard Haugesund players
FK Haugesund players
Sogndal Fotball players
Norwegian football managers
People from Hordaland
Association football defenders
Sportspeople from Vestland